Wageni Airport  is an airport serving the city of Beni, in the North Kivu Province of the Democratic Republic of the Congo. The airport is in the northeast section of the city.

See also

Transport in Democratic Republic of the Congo
List of airports in Democratic Republic of the Congo
Beni Airport

References

External links
OpenStreetMap - Beni-Wageni Airport
OurAirports - Wageni Airport
FallingRain - Wageni Airport

Airports in North Kivu